Omoto locomotive dump is a New Zealand Railways locomotive and rolling stock dump site located near Greymouth, New Zealand.

History of locomotive dumps
All locomotives and rolling stock inevitably reach obsolescence. When the cost of scrap metal dropped below an economic level, the New Zealand Railways found other uses for withdrawn locomotives and rolling stock. Some were discarded in locomotive dumps to protect the railway formation against erosion or soft ground. The railway line at Omoto suffered from severe erosion caused by flooding of the adjacent Grey River. During the 1950s, many obsolete locomotives and wagons on the South Island's West Coast were, accordingly, dumped here. Since disposal, Omoto, along with other locomotive dumps, has provided a treasure trove to many people interested in Railway archaeology.

The first conclusive locomotive dumpings to occur at Omoto began in 1957 and continued up to 1961. It is believed, however, that the dumpings started at an earlier date, as LA 312 was dumped in 1929, while the remains of P 135 were dumped in 1933. Large scale dumping did not take place until 1957, when a number of withdrawn locomotives, components of locomotives, and withdrawn wagons of various classes were dumped there.

Locomotives dumped at Omoto

Other locomotive dump sites
 Westfield, Auckland
 Oamaru
 Beaumont
 Branxholme
 Mararoa
 Bealey River
 Waimakariri River
Mōkihinui River

References

Locomotives of New Zealand
Grey District
Rail transport in the West Coast, New Zealand